The Personal Computer Series, or PC Series, was IBM's follow-up to the Personal System/2 and PS/ValuePoint. Announced in October 1994 and withdrawn in October 2000, it was replaced by the IBM NetVista, apart from the Pentium Pro-based PC360 and PC365, which were replaced by the IBM IntelliStation.

x86-based

PC 100
The PC 100 was a budget model, available only in selected markets.

PC 140
The PC 140 was a budget model, available only in selected markets.

PC Series 300
Industry standard ISA/PCI architecture, first IBM machines with USB. Processors ranged from the 486DX2-50, 486SX-25, 486DX4-100 to the Pentium 200 and in case of the Models 360 and 365 the Pentium Pro. 486 models had a selectable bus architecture (SelectaBus) through a replaceable riser-card, offering the choice of either VESA Local Bus/ISA or PCI/ISA.
Within the 300 series the following models appeared:

PC 330

Its last sub-model used the Pentium P54C processor clocked at 100, 133, 166, or 200 MHz. It had, depending on the sub-model, up to 4 ISA and/or 3 PCI expansion slots and four (2 external 5.25", 1 external and 1 internal 3.5") drive bays. It had in its latest version, the 6577, one DIMM-168 and 4 SIMM-72 memory slots, and featured an IBM SurePath BIOS. This PC has 2 USB 1.0 slots in the back. The latest version of Windows which can be installed on this PC is Windows XP, though Windows 2000 and Windows ME are optimal choices.

The DIMM-168 memory slot takes 5V EDO DRAM and is incompatible with the more commonly used 3.3V SDRAM. The slot looks the same at first glance, but the keying is different. Trying to force a 3.3V SDRAM module into the slot could damage both it and the memory module.

Submodels were:

PC 340

The PC 340, introduced in 1996, was a budget model. It used the Pentium processor clocked at 100, 133 or 166 MHz. It had 4 ISA and 3 PCI expansion slots and four (2 external 5.25 inch, 1 external and 1 internal 3.5 inch) drive bays. It had 4 SIMM-72 RAM slots, and featured an IBM SurePath BIOS.

The submodels were:
 PC 300 Series Model 340 (Model 6560-1xx)
 PC 300 Series Model 340 (Model 6560-4xx)
 PC 300 Series Model 340 (Model 6560-5xx)
 PC 300 Series Model 340 (Model 6560-6xx)
 PC 300 Series Model 340 (Model 6560-7xx)

PC 350
The PC 350, introduced over 1994 to 1995, was a middle-class model, having the same motherboard as the PC 330 in a much roomier case with additional drive bays. Processors ranged from the 486DX2-50, 486SX-25, 486DX4-100 to the Pentium 200. It had, depending on the sub-model up to 5 ISA and/or 3 PCI expansion slots and five (2 external 5.25", 1 external and 1 internal 3.5") drive bays. Like its smaller cousin, in its latest version it had 1 DIMM-168 and 4 SIMM-72 RAM slots, and featured an IBM SurePath BIOS.

Submodels were:

PC 360
The PC 360 was an ISA/PCI-based system with six expansion slots that uses the Pentium Pro CPU clocked at 150 or 200 MHz. It is packaged in a mini-tower with six drive bays. It had 4 SIMM-72 slots for a total of up to 128 MB of memory, and featured an IBM SurePath BIOS.
The submodels were:
 PC 360 Series Model 360 S150 (Model 6598-Cxx)
 PC 360 Series Model 360 S200 (Model 6598-Fxx)

PC 365
The PC 365 is an ISA/PCI-based multiprocessor system with five expansion slots. It supports dual Pentium Pro processors clocked at 180 or 200 MHz. The case has five drive bays and either two ISA or PCI slots, plus an additional three of which are shared ISA/PCI slots. It had 4 DIMM-168 slots for a total of up to 512 MB of memory, and featured an IBM SurePath BIOS.
The submodels were:
 PC 365 Series Model 360 S180 (Model 6589-10U, 11U, 17U)
 PC 365 Series Model 360 S200 (Model 6589-12U, 13U, 15U, 18U)

PC Series 700
These systems used the Intel Pentium processor with clock frequencies of 75, 90, 100, 133 and 166 MHz. Initial systems had selectable bus architecture (SelectaBus) through a replaceable riser-card. Options were either PCI/ISA or PCI/MCA. The ISA or MCA bus would be connected to the PCI bus using a PCI to ISA/MCA bridge. The advantage of this is that even operating systems without MCA support worked on the system, as long as the MCA portion was not required.

Two form-factors were available, the 3x3 (3 slot, 3 bay) PC 730 and the larger 5x5 (5 slot, 5 bay) PC 750.

PC Series 3000
This series was introduced in April 1996 in Canada only. It has a Pentium processor clocked at speeds ranging from 100 to 166 MHz and was shipped with a Mwave modem/sound card.

PC 300PL 
The 300PL used three models of processors during its lifetime, the Pentium MMX, Pentium II and Pentium III. Models using the Pentium MMX came in speeds of 166, 200 and 233 MHz; models using the Pentium II came in speeds of 266, 300, 333, 350, 400 or 450 MHz; and models using the Pentium III came in speeds of 450, 500, 533, 550, 600, 667, 733, 800 or 866 MHz.
The 300PL usually shipped with a hard drive with a capacity ranging from 2 GB to 20 GB, a CD-ROM drive, and a floppy drive. In some models, an IBM EtherJet 10/100 Ethernet network adapter is also included. The IBM 300PL came either in a tower or a desktop form-factor.

Four different types of form-factors exist:
 Three PCI slots, no AGP; it also has an extra bay for a CD or DVD drive (desktop)
 Three PCI slots and one AGP; it also an extra bay for a CD or DVD drive (desktop)
 Four PCI slots and one AGP; it also has an extra bay for a CD or DVD drive (desktop)
 Six PCI slots and one AGP; it also has two extra bays for a CD or DVD drive (tower)

PC 300GL
The PC 300GL used the Celeron, Pentium I, Pentium II and Pentium III throughout its lifetime. Celeron-based models had processors clocked at 333, 366, 433, 466, 500 or 533 MHz; Pentium I models had processors clocked at 133, or 166 MHz; Pentium II-based models had processors clocked at 350, 400, 450 MHz; and Pentium III-based models had processors clocked at 450, 500, 533, 550, 600, 667, 733, 800 or 866 MHz.

These systems were packaged in two case form-factors, desktop and micro-tower. There were two variants of the desktop case, one with two expansion slots and one with four. Both variants had four drive bays. The micro-tower case had four expansion slots and four drive bays.

PC 300XL
The PC 300XL uses the Pentium MMX clocked at 233MHz, or the Pentium II clocked at 233, 266 or 300 MHz. It features integrated 10/100 Ethernet.

PC Power Series 
This is the PC counterpart of the RS/6000

 PowerPC 604 processor at 100, 120 or 133 MHz
 ISA/PCI PReP architecture
 16 MB parity memory standard, expandable to 192 MB
 Integrated 10baseT Ethernet, PCI Graphics and Audio
 Supports Windows NT 3.51 or AIX Version 4
 ARC BIOS

Two form-factors were available, the 3x3 (3 slot, 3 bay) PC830 and the larger 5x5 (5 slot, 5 bay) PC850.

See also

 IBM IntelliStation
 IBM NetVista
 IBM PS/2
 IBM PS/ValuePoint
 IBM PC XT
 IBM PC AT
 IBM System AIX for the IBM PC Server Series

References

PC Series
Computer-related introductions in 1994